Maureen is the third studio album by German recording artist Joy Denalane. It was released by Nesola Records and Four Music on May 20, 2011, in German-speaking Europe. Her first German-language studio album since Mamani (2002), it takes its title from Denalane's middle name. Incorporating neo soul, R&B and hip hop styles, it features production and songwriting credits from Steve McKie, Kahedi, Bilal and Denalane's husband Max Herre.

Upon its release, Maureen received a positive response from critics and reached number eight on the German Albums Chart. Elsewhere, the album peaked at number thirty-six in Austria and number eleven on the Swiss Albums Chart, becoming both her highest and lowest-charting album yet, respectively. Spawning four singles, an English language version of Maureen was released in March 2012.

Track listing

Notes and sample credits
 denotes additional producer

Charts

Weekly charts

References

External links
 JoyDenalane.com — official site
 

2011 albums
Joy Denalane albums
Albums produced by Jake One